Jamjuree Art Gallery is an art museum owned by Chulalongkorn University in Bangkok, Thailand. Regular exhibits at the gallery include works of the university's students as well as more experimental exhibits by rising local artists, established national painters as well as international artists.

References

External links
 Jamjuree Art Gallery

Museums in Bangkok
Chulalongkorn University
Art museums and galleries in Thailand
University museums in Thailand